Martinus Jacobus Maria "Maarten" Sikking (13 February 1948 – 5 May 2009) was a field hockey goalkeeper from the Netherlands. He competed at the 1972 and 1976 Summer Olympics, where his team finished in fourth place on both occasions.

Between 1970 and 1980 Sikking played 123 international matches. His most remarkable game was the 1973 World Cup final in Amstelveen, the Netherlands, where he stopped one penalty shot in overtime, and two more in the penalty series. As a result, Netherlands won their first international hockey title.

Sikking was considered one of the best goalkeepers of his time, but never won an Olympic medal. He had high hopes for the 1980 Moscow Games, and after they were boycotted by the Dutch Hockey Federation he burned his hockey gear and retired from competitions. Later he worked in insurance and was involved in various charities in developing countries. He moved to Bali, Indonesia, where he set up a school, married his third wife, and died aged 61.

References

External links
 

1948 births
2009 deaths
Dutch male field hockey players
Olympic field hockey players of the Netherlands
Field hockey players at the 1972 Summer Olympics
Field hockey players at the 1976 Summer Olympics
Sportspeople from Bergen op Zoom
1978 Men's Hockey World Cup players